Cory Elius Fanus (born 13 March 1996) is a Barbadian badminton player. He was the men's doubles champion at the 2016 Suriname International tournament partnered with Dakeil Thorpe. Fanus represented his country at the 2018 Commonwealth Games in Gold Coast.

Achievements

BWF International Challenge/Series
Men's doubles

 BWF International Challenge tournament
 BWF International Series tournament
 BWF Future Series tournament

References

External links 
 
 
 

1996 births
Living people
Sportspeople from Bridgetown
Barbadian male badminton players
Badminton players at the 2018 Commonwealth Games
Commonwealth Games competitors for Barbados